Phạm Ngọc Lan (12 December 1934 – 14 June 2019) was a general of the People's Army of Vietnam. He was noted for being North Vietnam's first pilot 

an aerial combat on April 3, 1965.

Early life 

Phạm was born on December 12, 1934, on a farm in Dien Nam, in Điện Bàn District of Quảng Nam Province. Less than a month after the August Revolution in 1945, the French reoccupied Vietnam's southern region and began to militarily contest the central coastal region.

Early career 
In December 1948, after persuading his family, Lan applied to work with the police in Đắk Lắk Province at the age of 14. Due to his youth, he was only assigned to cooking tasks and was later transferred to communication work. In January 1949, Lan was writing about security for the Resistance Administrative Committee of Đắk Lắk. In October of that year, he went to do clerical work for the Đắk Lắk Province teams.

He continually volunteered for combat but was turned down because of his small size. In July 1952, at the age of 18, he was officially enlisted as a soldier with the clerical Political Committee Regiment 84  contact zone 5. From January 1953, he was a private soldier, vice squad leader, and squad leader of the University Team 602, Battalion 30, Regiment 96, and University Union 305. From his first battle, the Battle of An Khe Pass, at the age of 19 until the 1954 armistice, Lan participated in 10 battles from Pleiku to Qui Nhơn and along Route 1 from Nha Trang to Quang Nam, capturing six prisoners, including a French soldier.

Late in 1954, Lan was transferred North with his unit. In January 1955, Lan received further education at the School of Culture of the General Command in the Kien An, which aims to train selected officers.

His initial results were not satisfactory, but in only one year he quickly completed 10 years of education with excellent results.

In October 1956, Lan went to China to study at the School of the Air Force No. 3, Yungui Highlands, Yunnan with the rank of platoon leader. In training, Lan was always in the lead group and achieved the highest scores in all the eight subjects.

Meeting American planes in aerial combat 

On April 3, 1965, Lan participated in the first battle of Vietnam People's Air Force, where an attack aircraft of the U.S. Navy was ambushed in the region of the Thanh Hóa Bridge, a lifeline bridge that supplied military forces in the south.

Training and command 
After injuring his spine, Lan returned home when his superiors withdrew him from combat duty, and he was given the task of guiding and training young pilots and was promoted to lieutenant.

In April 1967, Lan was promoted to Regiment Captain and was appointed deputy of Air Force Regiment 921. In 1969, he was appointed Chairman of the Engineering Command of the Air Defence Air Force. In January 1973, he was sent for further study at the Air Force Academy, Gagarin, in the Soviet Union. After returning home in March 1974, he was appointed Head of Work Staff Training Air Force Air Defence and Air Force, and promoted to Major.

From 1975, he held the following positions:
 May 1977, Deputy Chief of Staff Air Force strains
 August 1977, studying at the Military Political Academy
 July 1978, Deputy Chief of Staff Air Force strains (2nd)
 August 1978, Deputy Division 371 Air Division
 April 1979, Division Chief Division 370 Air Force establishment
 July 1981, Chairman of the strains Air Force guidance
 November 1982, entitled Department Training School, Army Air Force strains
 December 1985, Director General of Military Training School Air Force strains
 June 1994, Deputy Director of Combat Training the General Staff

Lan was promoted to the rank of Major General in June 1992.

Retirement and death 

Lan retired in August 1999, and died on June 14, 2019, aged 84.

Awards 
 Third Military Medal
 Medal win (against France), First Class
 Medal-class struggle against the U.S.
 Achievement Medal (First Class, Second, Third)
 Soldiers Medal glorious (ranked first, second, Ba)
 Military Medal winning public decisions
 A coat of arms of Uncle Ho (for pilots shot down American aircraft)
 Coat 40 year Party
 Hero of the People's Armed Forces

Notes

External links 
 Secrets of the first U.S. aircraft shot down
 heroic Vietnam Air Force - Lesson 1: MIG 17 sorties
 VNAF Major General Pham Ngoc Lan andcallsthe spectacular landing with the fuselage
 Major General Pham Ngoc Lan pilots involved bombed Tan Son Nhat International Airport
 "not ashamed of a minute, which has second life "
 statistics of the first air combat game www.acig.org

1934 births
North Vietnamese military personnel of the Vietnam War
Vietnamese generals
People from Quảng Nam province
2019 deaths